The Incorrigible Barbara is a 1977 East German drama film written and directed by Lothar Warneke. It was entered into the 10th Moscow International Film Festival.

Cast
 Cox Habbema as Barbara
 Peter Aust as Herbert
 Hertha Thiele as Schwiegermutter
 Werner Godemann as Ferdinand
 Eberhard Esche as Ekki
 Adolf Fischer
 Renate Krößner
 Lothar Warneke

References

External links
 

1977 films
1977 drama films
East German films
German drama films
1970s German-language films
Films directed by Lothar Warneke
1970s German films